Gijs Kramer (21 November 1905 – 9 December 2001) was a Dutch painter. His work was part of the art competitions at the 1936 Summer Olympics and the 1948 Summer Olympics.

References

1905 births
2001 deaths
20th-century Dutch painters
Dutch male painters
Olympic competitors in art competitions
People from Zeist
20th-century Dutch male artists